Federico Delbonis was the defending champion, but decided not to compete.

Pablo Cuevas won the title, defeating Martin Kližan in the final, 6–3, 6–1.

Seeds

Draw

Finals

Top half

Bottom half

References
 Main Draw
 Qualifying Draw

Seguros Bolivar Open Barranquilla - Singles
2014 Singles